Yaw Oppong Kyekyeku (born 1 September 1947) is a Ghanaian Politician and Educationist. He was a member of the First parliament of the Fourth republic, and a member of parliament for Dormaa East in the Brong Ahafo region of Ghana.

Early life and education 
Kyekyeku born in 1947, attended Wesley College, Kumasi where he received a Teachers' training certificate in Mathematics.

Political career 
He was a member of the National Democratic Congress (NDC). In April 1991, He made a come back to the  Provisional National Defense Council (PNDC) after being dismissed on the grounds of "Mental Exhaustion", but he made a come back in July that same year which gave him the chance to contest in the parliamentary primaries. He won the primaries and contested the Dormaa East seat on the ticket of the NDC to represent Dormaa East. Prior to winning the seat, He was a former district secretary Afiagya Sekyere in the Ashanti region from 1986 to 1993. He Served for one term in parliament, and was replaced by Nicholas K. Adjei- Kyeremeh of the National Democratic Congress who polled 9,103 votes representing 36.10% of the total votes cast. Adjei- Kyeremeh won the seat against Stephen Adoma-Yeboah of the New Patriotic Party (NPP) and Gyabaah Samuel of the People's National Convention  whose votes represent 29.60% and 1.40% of the total votes respectively. In 2002 Kyekyeku resigned from the NDC to join the NPP claiming  his decision is to make sure: "survival of the new political dispensation by carrying out my capacity building exercise for metropolitan, municipal and district assemblies."

Personal life 
Kyekyeku is a Christian.

References 

1947 births
Ghanaian MPs 1993–1997
Ghanaian educators
National Democratic Congress (Ghana) politicians
New Patriotic Party politicians
Living people